Mulamoottil Adima is a 1985 Indian Malayalam-language period drama film directed by P. K. Joseph, written by Pappanamkodu Lakshmanan and produced by E. K. Thyagarajan. It is based on the life of Adimakannu / Mulamoottil Adima, an outlaw active in the Central Travancore region known for stealing from rich and giving to poor. The film stars Mohanlal in the title role, alongside Mucherla Aruna, Janardanan and Surekha. The film features songs composed by M. K. Arjunan and a score by S. P. Venkatesh.

Cast 
Mohanlal as Adimakannu / Mulamoottil Adima
M. G. Soman as Moideen
Adoor Bhasi as Shiva Swamy
Mucherla Aruna as Sainaba
Santhosh as Abu
Janardanan as Ibrahim
C. I. Paul as Chembakaraman
Surekha as Devamma
Meena as Parvathiamma
Jagathy Sreekumar as Lawrence
G. K. Pillai as Hydraman
P. R. Varalakshmi as Laila
Stanly
Murali Mohan
Kaduvakulam Antony
Jaffer Khan

Soundtrack 
The film's songs were composed by M. K. Arjunan and the lyrics were written by Pappanamkodu Lakshmanan, Devadas, and Cheramangalam. Film's score was composed by S. P. Venkatesh. Soundtrack album was released by Nisari Audios on 12 August 1985.

References

External links 
 

1985 films
1980s Malayalam-language films
Biographical films about bandits
Films about outlaws
Indian historical drama films
History of Kerala on film
Films shot in Kollam
Films shot in Alappuzha
1970s historical drama films
Films set in the British Raj